Americorchestia is a genus of beach hoppers in the family Talitridae. There are about five described species in Americorchestia.

Species
These five species belong to the genus Americorchestia:
 Americorchestia barbarae Bousfield, 1991
 Americorchestia heardi Bousfield, 1991
 Americorchestia longicornis (Say, 1818) (common Atlantic sandhopper)
 Americorchestia megalophthalma (Bate, 1862) (northern big-eyed sandhopper)
 Americorchestia salomani Bousfield, 1991

References

Further reading

External links

 

Amphipoda
Articles created by Qbugbot